The 2023 Milan Ciga Vasojević Cup is the 17th season of the Serbian women's national basketball cup tournament.

The tournament was held in Niš from 19 to 20 March 2023.

Qualified teams

Venue

Bracket

Semifinals

Final

See also
2022–23 First Women's Basketball League of Serbia
2022–23 Radivoj Korać Cup

References

External links
  

Milan Ciga Vasojević Cup
Basketball
Serbia